The Maskew Miller Longman Literature Awards were established in 2007 by Maskew Miller Longman, an educational publishing company in South Africa. The competition was created to encourage writing in all of South Africa’s 11 official languages, with a particular focus on literature suitable for a youth audience.

The genres rotate each year between novels, drama and short stories. It is the only competition to invite entries in all official languages. Past judges include André Brink, John Kani, Riana Scheepers, Andries Oliphant and Niki Daly.

2018 Youth Literature (incomplete)

Xitsonga
Winner: Musa Baloyi, Nyimpi ya Miehleketo

2017 Children's Fiction

Afrikaans
Winner: Alwyn Tredoux

English
Winner: Clare Houston

IsiXhosa
Winner: Zukiswa Pakama

Sepedi
Winner: Maledimo Winfred Moeng

Sesotho
Winner: Bongiwe Siphesihle Buthelezi

2016 (incomplete)

Xitsonga
Winner: Musa Baloyi, Vutlhari Bya Lunya

2015 Children's Fiction

Afrikaans
Winner: Jelleke Wierenga, Mensekind teen die monstervlieg

English
Winner: Bridget Pitt, The Night of the Go-away Birds

IsiXhosa
Winner: Sipho Richard Kekezwa, Icebo Likamalusi

IsiZulu
Winner: Emmanuel Nkosinathi Nazo, Imbewu Yomuthi Obabayo

Sepedi
Winner: Mabonchi Goodwill Motimele, La Fata Gal Le Boe Fela

Setswana
Winner: Thatayaone Raymond Dire, Ngwana Sejo o a Tlhakanelwa

Tshivenda 
Winner: Tshifhiwa Given Mukwevho, Mveledzo na Zwighevhenga

Xitsonga
Winner: Conny Masocha Lubisi, Xixima

2014 Drama

Afrikaans
Winner: Cecilia du Toit, BFF

English
Winner: Charmaine Kendal, Doorways

IsiXhosa
Winner: Madoda Mlokoti, Inzala YamaRhamba

IsiZulu
Winner: Nakanjani Sibiya, Ngikuthanda ukhona lapho

Sepedi
Winner: Phillip Mothupi, Ga le batswadi ba selo

Tshivenda 
Winner: Nekhavhambe Khalirendwe, Ganuko a li vhuisi tshalo

Xitsonga
Winner: Conny Masocha Lubisi, Ya Raha!

2013 Novels

Afrikaans
Winner: François Verster, Een teen Adamastor

English
Winner: Maria Phalime, Second chances

IsiXhosa
Winner: Zukiswa Pakama, Idaba likasithembele

IsiZulu
Winner: Mandla Ndlovu, Imfihlo ngujuqu

Sepedi
Winner: Jimmy Moshidi, Tahlego maleka

Sesotho
Winner: Lehlohonolo Mokoena, Mpho ya ka

Setswana
Winner: Richard Moloele, Itlho le le losi

Xitsonga
Winner: Connie M. Lubisi, Ndzhwalo

2012 Youth Drama

Afrikaans
Winner: Cecilia du Toit
Runner up: Braam van der Vyver
Runner up: Maretha Maartens

English
Winner: Karina Szczurek
Runner up: Mark Scheepers
Runner up: Richard Street

IsiNdebele
Winner: Cecilia du Toit
Runner up: Sovumani K. Mahlangu

isiXhosa
Winner: Athini Watu
Runner up: Sipho R. Kekezwa
Runner up: Sipho R. Kekezwa

IsiZulu
Winner: Mbongeni C. Nzimande
Runner up: Dumisani Hlatshwayo
Runner up: Jeffrey V. Gumede

Sesotho
Winner: Kgoeli E. Phlosi
Runner up: Morena S Tsie

Sepedi
Winner: Tebogo D. Maahlamela
Runner up: Martin K. Lebotse

Setswana
Winner: Letia J. Gabonnwe
Runner up: Othusitse M. Lobelo

SiSwati
Winner: Petras T. Jele
Runner up: Dumisani Magagula

Tshivenda
Winner: Hednar R. Tshianane
Runner up: Rudzani Mafhege
Runner up: Maswole Netshirando

Xitsonga
Winner and runner-up: Masocha Lubisi

2010 Children’s stories
Afrikaans
Winner: Jelleke Wierenga, "Kat in die pan vir die Fransman"
Runner-up: Carina Diedericks-Hugo, "Die Groenmambas en Shaka se spies"
Runner-up: Jelleke Wierenga, "‘n Bosluis red die koningshuis"

English
Winner: Gail Smith, "Bongani's Secret"
Runner-up: Pamela Newham, "Three Blind Dates"

IsiXhosa
Winner: Sivuyile Mazantsi, "Unyanelizwe"

Sepedi
Winner: Norman Mahlanya, "Kgetha Nna"

Xitsonga
Winner: Conny Lubisi, "Lembe Lerintshwa"

2009 Short stories
Afrikaans
Winner: Annami Simon vir die storie Johanna Magdalena "Matthee"
Runner-up: Jeanetta Basson vir die storie "'n Bed vir Johnny"
Runner-up: Fanie Viljoen vir die storie "Verneukkind"

English
Winner: Karen Jennings for the story "Mia and The Shark"
Runner-up: Jayne Bauling for the story "Dineo 658 MP"

IsiNdebele
Winner: Moses S. K. Mahlangu for the story "Amaberha2
Runner-up: Moses S. K. Mahlangu for the story "Incwajana necwadi"

IsiXhosa
Winner: Phakamile Gongo for the story "Itonga kaGugile"
Runner-up: Sipho Kekezwa for the story "Lelikabane eli Tyala?"

IsiZulu
Winner: Mandla Ndlovu for the story "Ungayithi Vu!"
Runner-up: Thabo Raboteng for the story "Kwasha"

Sepedi
Winner: M. P. Mathete for the story "Ke yo dula kae?Runner-up: M. P. Mathete for the story "Molato ke wa mang?"

Sesotho
Winner: Kgotso P. D. Maphalla for the story "Moetapele ke moetapele"
Runner-up: Kgotso P. D. Maphalla for the story "Yaba re emere eme"

Siswati
Winner: Mpumelelo N. Mkhatshwa for the story "Yangena intfombi lemhlophe"
Runner-up: Mpumelelo N. Mkhatshwa for the story "Kwaphela Emaphupho"

Tshivenda
Winner: Lufuno Ndlovu for the story "Ndo lovha nga dzi 22 Lambami 2004"
Runner-up: Rudzani Tshianane for the story "Vha sokou nadzo goo!"

Xitsonga
Winner: Conny Lubisi for the story "Rivoni"
Runner-up: Conny Lubisi for the story "Ndzi fikele"

2008 Drama
Afrikaans
Winner: Cecilia du Toit, "Boetie Beter Bester"

English
Winner: Charles J. Fourie, "The Lighthouse Keeper’s Wife"
Runner-up: Barbara Woodhead, "The Prize"

IsiXhosa
Winner: N. Tutani, Gawulayo! Gawulayo!IsiZulu
Winner: P. F. Kekane, Isihlahla SendlelaSepedi
Winner: Aletta Motimele, DitokeloRunner-up: Mmathwane George, Morutisi wa SejatoSesotho
Winner: Teboho Letshaba, NtshunyakgareRunner-up: Teboho Letshaba, Lejwe la KgopisoSetswana
Winner: Kobelo Stephen Naledi, MaikotlhaoTshivenda
Winner: Domina Napoleon Munzhelele, BodzandalaXitsonga
Winner: Conny Lubisi, Mangwa2007 Novels
Afrikaans
Winner: Jaco Jacobs, VerneukpanRunner-up: Francois Bloemhof, Stad aan die Einde van die WereldRunner-up: Braam van der Vyfer, Helpers uit die Kryt!English
Winner: Dianne Case and Yvonne Hart, Katy of Sky RoadRunner-up: Mabonchi Motimele, The Boy with the GuitarRunner-up: Becky Apteker, Written in WaterIsiZulu
Winner: M. M. Ndlovu, Amathonsi AbanziSepedi
Winner: A. Motimele, Mepipi ka Moka e a NaRunner-up: M. C. Mphahlele, Dilo Tsela ke BathoSetswana
Winner: P. Tseole, Ke Go Jetse Eng?Tshivenda
Winner: H. R. Tshianane, VhuanzwoXitsonga
Winner: Conny Lubisi, XijahatanaRunner-up: W. R. Chauke, Vito Ra MinaRunner-up: Conny Lubisi, N’wina''

Illustrations
Winner: Lizette Duvenage
Runner-up: Dale Blankenaar

References

External links
 Maskew Miller Longman
 Sussie Veer is dood en ander verhale reviewed by Lona Gericke (IBBY)
 2007 MML Literature Award winner, Katy of Sky Road, selected for IBBY Honour List
 François Bloemhof
 Making contact

South African literary awards
South African literary events